Nefertkau is the name of several ancient Egyptian women:
 Nefertkau I, a daughter of Pharaoh Sneferu,
 Nefertkau II, wife of Prince Khufukhaf I
 Nefertkau III, possibly a granddaughter of Pharaoh Khufu.
 Nefertkau, a daughter of Nefertkau III and Iynefer II.